Princess Leia Organa is a fictional character and one of the main protagonists in the Star Wars franchise, portrayed in films by Carrie Fisher. Introduced in the original Star Wars film in 1977, Leia is princess of the planet Alderaan, a member of the Imperial Senate and an agent of the Rebel Alliance. She thwarts the sinister Sith Lord Darth Vader and helps bring about the destruction of the Empire's cataclysmic superweapon, the Death Star. In The Empire Strikes Back (1980), Leia commands a Rebel base and evades Vader as she falls in love with the smuggler Han Solo. In Return of the Jedi (1983), Leia helps in the operation to rescue Han from the crime lord Jabba the Hutt and is revealed to be Vader's daughter and the twin sister of Luke Skywalker.

The prequel film Revenge of the Sith (2005) establishes that the twins' mother is Senator (and former queen) Padmé Amidala of Naboo, who dies after childbirth, while their father is none other than former Jedi Knight Anakin Skywalker, who would become Darth Vader. Leia is adopted by Senator Bail and Queen Breha Organa of Alderaan. In the sequel trilogy, Leia is a founder and General of the Resistance against the First Order. She and Han have a son named Ben Solo, who adopted the name Kylo Ren after turning to the dark side of the Force and became the lead enforcer for the First Order. In The Rise of Skywalker (2019), it is revealed that Leia was briefly trained as a Jedi by her brother sometime after Return of the Jedi. In the film, Leia is the mentor of Rey, the last remaining Jedi. Leia dies towards the end of the film but returns in the epilogue scene as a Force ghost alongside Luke.

One of the more popular Star Wars characters, Leia has been called a 1980s icon, a feminist hero and model for other adventure heroines. She has appeared in many derivative works and merchandising, including the now-noncanonical Star Wars Expanded Universe, and has been referenced or parodied in several TV shows and films. Her 'cinnamon bun' hairstyle from Star Wars (1977) and metal bikini from Return of the Jedi have become cultural icons. Fisher was nominated for the Saturn Award for Best Actress twice for A New Hope and Return of the Jedi. Fisher later received two Saturn Award nominations for Best Supporting Actress, the first for The Force Awakens and the second being a posthumous nomination for The Last Jedi.

Creation and casting
Leia was created by Star Wars creator George Lucas, who in 1999 explained his early development of the main characters:

In the rough draft of Star Wars, Leia is the spoiled teenage daughter of King Kayos and Queen Breha of Aquilae, with two brothers, Biggs and Windy; Biggs returned to the fourth draft as a childhood friend of Luke. Leia was at one point "the daughter of Owen Lars and his wife Beru ... Luke's cousin–together they visit the grave of his mother, who perished with his father on a planet destroyed by the Death Star." A later story synopsis establishes Leia as "Leia Antilles", the daughter of Bail Antilles from the peaceful world of Organa Major. In the fourth draft it was established that "Leia Organa" came instead from Alderaan.

Fisher was 19 when she was cast as Princess Leia, with actresses including Amy Irving, Cindy Williams and Jodie Foster also up for the role. In 2014, InkTank reported that the extended list of "more than two dozen actresses" who had auditioned for Leia included Glenn Close, Farrah Fawcett, Jessica Lange, Sissy Spacek, Sigourney Weaver, Cybill Shepherd, Jane Seymour, Anjelica Huston, Kim Basinger, Kathleen Turner, Geena Davis, Meryl Streep, and Terri Nunn. Asked about Streep in 2015, Fisher said, "I've never heard that one. But Jodie Foster was up for it... that one I knew the most. Amy Irving and Jodie. And I got it."

On Leia's 'cinnamon bun' hairstyle, George Lucas stated that "In the 1977 film, I was working very hard to create something different that wasn't fashion, so I went with a kind of Southwestern Pancho Villa woman revolutionary look. ... The buns are basically from turn-of-the-century Mexico." Lucas later noted that Leia's mother, Padmé Amidala, wears a similar-looking Hopi hairstyle in Revenge of the Sith. A photo depicting famous Mexican revolutionary Clara de la Rocha wearing a similar hairstyle exists in the Lucas Museum of Narrative Art archives. In 2015, Mental Floss cited research suggesting that while female Mexican revolutionaries did not have such elaborate hairstyles, young marriageable Hopi women did, and their "squash blossom whorls" superficially resemble Leia's hair buns. Leia's hairstyle may have also been inspired by that of Queen Fria in the 1939 Flash Gordon comic strip "The Ice Kingdom of Mongo", and scientist Barnes Wallis' wife Molly (played by Ursula Jeans) in the 1955 war film The Dam Busters. Comparisons have also been made to the 4th-century-BC Iberian sculpture Lady of Elche, as well as the 1920s "earphones" hairstyle.

Composer John Williams created a musical leitmotif for Leia which recurs throughout the Star Wars saga. "Princess Leia's Theme" was recorded as a concert suite (4:18 length) for the score of the 1977 film.

The second draft of the Return of the Jedi screenplay contained dialogue in which Obi-Wan tells Luke he has a twin sister. She and their mother were "sent to the protection of friends in a distant system. The mother died shortly thereafter, and Luke's sister was adopted by Ben's friends, the governor of Alderaan and his wife." Fisher explained in 1983: "Leia's real father left her mother when she was pregnant, so her mother married this King Organa. I was adopted and grew up set apart from other people because I was a princess."

Character
Anthony Breznican of Entertainment Weekly describes Leia as a "diplomat, spy, warrior, undercover agent". Mark Edlitz calls her "a smart, feisty, brave diplomat and warrior" in The Huffington Post. Fisher told Rolling Stone in 1983:

She said in 2014:

Appearances

Skywalker saga

Original trilogy

Star Wars (A New Hope)

Introduced in the original 1977 film Star Wars, Princess Leia Organa of Alderaan is a member of the Imperial Senate. She is captured by Darth Vader (portrayed by David Prowse, voiced by James Earl Jones) on board the ship Tantive IV, where she is acting as a spy for the Rebel Alliance. Leia has secretly hidden the blueprints for the Death Star, the Empire's moon-sized battle station, inside the astromech droid R2-D2 (Kenny Baker) and has sent it to find one of the last remaining Jedi, Obi-Wan Kenobi (Alec Guinness), on the nearby planet of Tatooine. Vader arrests Leia and has her tortured, but she resists revealing anything. Death Star commander Grand Moff Tarkin (Peter Cushing) threatens to destroy her home planet Alderaan with the Death Star unless she reveals the location of the hidden Rebel base. She provides the location of an old, abandoned base on the planet Dantooine, but Tarkin orders Alderaan to be destroyed anyway. Leia is rescued by Luke Skywalker (Mark Hamill) and Han Solo (Harrison Ford), and they escape aboard Han's ship, the Millennium Falcon. After analyzing the Death Star's schematics, the Rebels find a tiny weakness in the battle station, which Luke uses to destroy it in his X-wing. In the aftermath of the victory, Leia bestows medals on the heroes at the hidden Rebel base on Yavin 4.

Alyssa Rosenberg of The Washington Post writes of Leia in the film:

Rosenberg also notes that, though Han is almost immediately attracted to Leia, they conflict because she insists on asserting command and he automatically resists, even as she proves herself to be worthy of it. And despite her initial disdain for the smuggler, whom she sees as selfish, Leia later acknowledges "I knew there was more to you than money" when Han comes through for the Rebellion.

Fisher told Rolling Stone in 1980 that in the original script, when Luke and Han come to rescue a captured Leia, "I was hanging upside down with yellow eyes, like in The Exorcist ... Some form of radar torture was done to me and I was in a beam, bruised and beaten up, suspended in midair. The reason it was cut from the film was because I was unconscious and the Wookiee would have had to carry me for, like, the next fifteen minutes."

The Empire Strikes Back
In The Empire Strikes Back (1980), Leia is at the Rebel base on Hoth. She leads its evacuation during an Imperial attack, and then flees with Han, Chewbacca (Peter Mayhew) and C-3PO (Anthony Daniels) on the Millennium Falcon. They dodge pursuing Imperial TIE fighters by flying into an asteroid field when the Falcon hyperdrive breaks down, with Leia piloting the ship at one point. Romance blossoms between Leia and Han during their flight from the Empire; while hiding in the stomach of a space slug, they finally share a kiss. With his ship needing repairs, Han seeks out his old friend Lando Calrissian (Billy Dee Williams) in Cloud City, the floating city over Bespin. Though he welcomes them graciously, Lando soon turns them over to a newly arrived Darth Vader, who hopes to use them as bait to capture Luke. Leia confesses her love for Han as he is frozen in carbonite and then handed over to bounty hunter Boba Fett (portrayed by Jeremy Bulloch, voiced by Jason Wingreen), who is charged with bringing him to the crime lord Jabba the Hutt. Lando helps Leia, Chewbacca and the two droids escape. Leia senses that Luke is in trouble, and goes back to save him after he is nearly killed during a lightsaber duel and confrontation with Vader.

Rosenberg notes:

Return of the Jedi
In Return of the Jedi (1983), Leia infiltrates Jabba the Hutt's palace on Tatooine disguised as the Ubese bounty hunter Boushh and brings a captive Chewbacca with her as part of the ruse. She frees Han from the carbonite, but they are recaptured by Jabba. Leia is now chained to Jabba as his slave, outfitted in a metal bikini. After Luke arrives and kills Jabba's rancor, Jabba sentences Luke, Han and Chewbacca to be fed to the sarlacc. Lando (disguised as a guard) helps them overpower their captors, and Leia seizes the moment to strangle Jabba with her chain. Luke and Leia swing to safety, blowing up Jabba's barge behind them. Later, the heroes go to the forest moon of Endor to prepare for a battle with the Empire. There, Luke reveals to Leia that she is his twin sister and that Vader is their father. Leia joins Han in leading the Rebels in battle with Imperial troops as the Rebel fleet attacks the second Death Star. Leia is slightly injured, but the Rebels, with help from the Ewoks, ultimately defeat the forces of the Empire, with the Death Star destroyed once more.

Fisher told Rolling Stone in 1983, "In Return of the Jedi, [Leia] gets to be more feminine, more supportive, more affectionate. But let's not forget that these movies are basically boys' fantasies. So the other way they made her more female in this one was to have her take off her clothes." Rosenberg writes of Han and Leia:

In the film, Leia says that she has vague memories of her real mother, who she describes as "kind... but sad". Bouzereau quoted Lucas in 1997:

Prequel trilogy

Revenge of the Sith
In the prequel film Revenge of the Sith (2005), Padmé Amidala (Natalie Portman) is pregnant with Anakin Skywalker's (Hayden Christensen) twins near the end of the Clone Wars. After Anakin turns to the dark side of the Force and becomes Darth Vader, Padmé gives birth to Luke and Leia on Polis Massa and then dies. Leia is adopted by Senator Bail Organa (Jimmy Smits) and his wife, Queen Breha (Rebecca Jackson Mendoza), of Alderaan.

Film critic Peter Travers of Rolling Stone wrote, "As we watch Anakin nearly melt in the lava, only to be put together, Frankenstein style, in a lab, while Lucas intercuts scenes of Padme giving birth to the twins Luke and Leia, a link to genuine feeling is established at last."

Sequel trilogy

The Force Awakens

In March 2013, Fisher confirmed that she would reprise her role as an older Leia in Star Wars: The Force Awakens. Set 30 years after Return of the Jedi, The Force Awakens reintroduces a Leia who is "a little more battle weary, a little more broken hearted". In November 2015, director J. J. Abrams said of Leia, "She's referred to as General but ... there's a moment in the movie where a character sort of slips and calls her 'Princess.'" Commenting on the story he added, "The stakes are pretty high in the story for her, so there's not much goofing around where Leia's concerned." Asked how Leia is handling things in the film, Fisher said, "Not easily ... [she is] solitary. Under a lot of pressure. Committed as ever to her cause, but I would imagine feeling somewhat defeated, tired, and pissed."

In the film, Leia is the leader of the Resistance, a group formed by the New Republic to fight a proxy war with the First Order (a group formed by the remnants of the Empire) and trying to find Luke, who disappeared years earlier. When her forces foil a First Order attack searching for the Resistance astromech droid BB-8, Leia is reunited with Han, who has helped the renegade stormtrooper Finn (John Boyega) and orphaned scavenger Rey (Daisy Ridley) bring the droid this far. Han and Leia are still married but have been estranged for a couple of years; after their son, Ben Solo (Adam Driver), fell to the dark side and became the First Order warlord Kylo Ren. Leia believes Ben can still be brought back to the light side. Han volunteers for a mission to infiltrate the First Order's Starkiller Base to disable its defensive shields. Confronting Ren, Han tries to convince his son to leave the First Order to honor Leia's request of bringing him home, but Ren instead impales his father on his lightsaber. Leia senses Han's death through the Force, and later shares a moment of grief with Rey, who had thought of Han as a mentor and father figure. Leia sees Rey, Chewbacca, and R2-D2 off when they depart to locate Luke, saying, "may the Force be with you".

Asked why Leia is not shown to be a Jedi in The Force Awakens (as she is in the Star Wars Expanded Universe works), Abrams told IGN, "It was a great question, and one that we talked about quite a bit, even with Carrie [Fisher]. Why did she not take advantage of this natural Force strength that this character had. And one of the answers was that it was simply a choice that she made, that her decision to run the Rebellion, and ultimately this Resistance, and consider herself a General, as opposed to a Jedi. It was simply a choice that she took". He also added, "I would like to think that there really isn't much of a ticking clock, and it's never too late ... clearly we've seen, and we do again, that she still is Force strong. And it's something that I think is an intrinsic piece of her character.

Fisher was nominated for a 2016 Saturn Award for Best Supporting Actress for her portrayal.

The Last Jedi
In December 2015, producer Kathleen Kennedy confirmed that Fisher would reprise the role of Leia in the next installment, then known as Star Wars: Episode VIII, but later named Star Wars: The Last Jedi. Fisher died on December 27, 2016, after going into cardiac arrest. It was confirmed that she had completed filming her role in the film shortly before her death.

In the film, Leia is among those on the bridge of her flagship, the MC85 Star Cruiser Raddus, who are expelled into space when the ship is attacked by the First Order. Leia uses the Force to pull herself back to the ship. After recovering, she shoots and stuns Resistance pilot Poe Dameron (Oscar Isaac), who has mutinied against her successor, Vice Admiral Holdo (Laura Dern). From his solitude on Ahch-To, Luke projects himself through the Force to the Resistance stronghold on Crait and reunites with Leia, apologizing for what happened to Ben. Leia replies that she knows her son is gone, but Luke reassures her that "no one's ever really gone". While Luke distracts Kylo and his attacking First Order troops, Leia is among the remaining Resistance forces who escape from Crait in the Millennium Falcon.

The Rise of Skywalker
Following Fisher's death, Variety reported that she was slated to appear in Star Wars: The Rise of Skywalker and speculated that Lucasfilm would need to find a way to address her death and what would become of her character. Filming began on August 1, 2018. Lucasfilm announced in January 2017 that they had "no plans to digitally recreate Carrie Fisher's performance as Princess or General Leia Organa". In April 2017, Fisher's family granted Disney and Lucasfilm the rights to use recent footage of the late actress in The Rise of Skywalker. However, Kennedy subsequently said that Fisher would not appear in the film. In July 2018, it was announced that Fisher would appear as Leia in The Rise of Skywalker, using unseen footage from The Force Awakens. Initially, there had also been plans to use additional unseen footage of Leia from The Last Jedi, but it was ultimately not included in the ninth film. Fisher's daughter Billie Lourd, who portrayed Lieutenant Connix in all three sequel trilogy films, also stepped in as Leia for a brief flashback in the film in which her face was digitally replaced by Fisher's likeness, using imagery from Return of the Jedi.

In the film, Leia continues to lead the Resistance while offering guidance and support to Rey as she continues her training to become a Jedi. A flashback reveals that Leia had abandoned her own training after she had a vision foretelling her son's death if she finished. While Rey and Ren duel on Kef Bir, a dying Leia uses all of her remaining strength to reach out to her son. Distracted after sensing his mother's death, Ren is stabbed by Rey with his own lightsaber. Leia passes away, making Rey experience overwhelming guilt. Rey heals Ren's wound using the Force. After the Battle of Exegol, a redeemed Ben Solo sacrifices the remainder of his life force to resurrect a dead Rey, and he vanishes at the same time as Leia becomes one with the Force. Rey then returns to the Lars homestead on Tatooine and buries the lightsabers that had belonged to Leia and her father, Anakin Skywalker as the spirits of Luke and Leia look on with pride, with Rey honoring them by adopting the surname "Skywalker".

Anthology films

Rogue One: A Star Wars Story
Leia makes a brief appearance in the final scene of the 2016 film Rogue One, receiving the plans for the Death Star as a lead-up to the beginning of A New Hope. Since this movie takes place prior to the original Star Wars trilogy, a very young Leia was required. To achieve that effect, a computer-generated image of a young Carrie Fisher was superimposed over Norwegian actress Ingvild Deila's face; archival audio of Fisher saying "Hope" was used to voice the character.

Television
Leia appears briefly in 1978's Star Wars Holiday Special television film as a leader and administrator of the new Rebel Alliance base. She and C-3PO contact Chewbacca's wife Mallatobuck for assistance in finding Chewbacca and Han. Leia also appears in the cartoon segment at a different Rebel Base, located in an asteroid field, and at the Life Day ceremony at the end of the film. Fisher also appeared in and hosted the November 18, 1978, episode of Saturday Night Live that aired one day after the holiday special.

Star Wars Rebels
A teenage version of Princess Leia, voiced by Julie Dolan, appears in a 2016 episode of the animated series Star Wars Rebels, which is set between Revenge of the Sith and A New Hope. In the episode, Leia is sent on a secret mission to assist the titular rebels. Executive producer Dave Filoni said of the appearance:

Star Wars Forces of Destiny
Leia appears in the animated series Star Wars Forces of Destiny, voiced by Shelby Young.

Star Wars Resistance
Leia appears in the animated series Star Wars Resistance, voiced by Rachel Butera and Carolyn Hennesy.

Obi-Wan Kenobi
Leia appears as a ten-year-old child in the live-action series Obi-Wan Kenobi, portrayed by Vivien Lyra Blair.

Novels
Leia makes her first literary appearance in Star Wars: From the Adventures of Luke Skywalker, the novelization of the original 1977 film Star Wars, which was released six months before the film in November 1976. Credited to Lucas but ghostwritten by Alan Dean Foster, the novel was based on Lucas' screenplay. Leia later appeared in the novelizations The Empire Strikes Back (1980) by Donald F. Glut and Return of the Jedi (1983) by James Kahn. She is also a point-of-view character in the 2015 novelization of The Force Awakens by Foster.

Foster's 1978 novel Splinter of the Mind's Eye was commissioned by Lucas as the basis for a potential low-budget sequel to Star Wars should the film prove unsuccessful. In the story, Luke and Leia seek a crystal on a swampy planet and eventually face Vader in combat.

Leia also appears in the Journey to Star Wars: The Force Awakens line of novels and comic books, introduced in conjunction with The Force Awakens to connect the film with previous installments. She is the lead character in the young adult novel Moving Target: A Princess Leia Adventure (2015) by Cecil Castellucci and Jason Fry, which is set between The Empire Strikes Back and Return of the Jedi, and Claudia Gray's novels Star Wars: Bloodline (2016) and Leia: Princess of Alderaan (2017). The former is set six years before The Force Awakens, while the latter features a 16-year-old Leia before the events of A New Hope. She also leads in Beth Revis' Star Wars: The Princess and the Scoundrel which is set immediately right after Return of the Jedi.

Comics
Leia is the lead character in the five-part comic limited series Star Wars: Princess Leia (2015), taking place immediately after Episode IV: A New Hope. She is also featured prominently in the four-part comic limited series Star Wars: Shattered Empire (2015), set immediately after Return of the Jedi. Princess Leia reveals Leia to have had royal training in martial arts and explores her reaction to the destruction of Alderaan, while Shattered Empire portrays her as a skilled pilot who undertakes a dangerous mission alongside Poe Dameron's mother. In Princess Leia and Shattered Empire, Leia senses the past while on Naboo (briefly envisioning her mother and Darth Maul, respectively), and in Star Wars #12, she uses a lightsaber as a weapon for the first time, canonically.

Legends works

The original three Star Wars films have spawned a large franchise of works that include novels, comic books, and video games. Leia appears in much of this material. In April 2014 (with the sequel film The Force Awakens in production), Lucasfilm excluded the Star Wars Expanded Universe from official Star Wars canon, rebranding it as Star Wars Legends.

In this continuity, Leia continues her adventures with Han and Luke after Return of the Jedi, fighting Imperial resurgences and new threats to the galaxy. She becomes the Chief of State of the New Republic and a Jedi master, and is the mother to three children by Han: Jaina, Jacen and Anakin Solo.

Novels
The 1991 New York Times bestselling novel Heir to the Empire by Timothy Zahn began what would become a large collection of works set before, between and especially after the original films.

Post-Return of the Jedi
The bestselling Thrawn trilogy (1991–93) by Timothy Zahn begins five years after the events of Return of the Jedi. In Heir to the Empire (1991), Leia is married to Han and three months pregnant with twins. Noghri commandos repeatedly attempt to kidnap her as part of Grand Admiral Thrawn's plan to restore the Empire and crush the New Republic. In Dark Force Rising (1992), Leia realizes that Darth Vader and the Empire deceived the Noghri to secure their allegiance, and by revealing the truth she turns the alien race to the side of the New Republic. At one point, she remembers her adoptive parents on Alderaan, implying that the "mother" she discussed with Luke on Endor was Queen Breha. In The Last Command (1993), Leia gives birth to the twins Jaina and Jacen Solo on Coruscant during Thrawn's siege.

Leia, now the Chief of State of the New Republic, is a minor character in the Jedi Academy trilogy (1994) by Kevin J. Anderson, set after the Thrawn trilogy. Next in the timeline is the Callista trilogy: Children of the Jedi (1995) by Barbara Hambly, Darksaber (1995) by Anderson and Planet of Twilight (1997) by Hambly. In The Crystal Star (1994) by Vonda McIntyre, young Jacen, Jaina and their three-year-old brother Anakin are kidnapped in a plot to restore the Empire, but are rescued by Leia and Chewbacca. Leia struggles with the responsibilities of her position in The Black Fleet Crisis trilogy (1996) by Michael P. Kube-McDowell. In The New Rebellion (1996) by Kristine Kathryn Rusch, she avoids an assassination attempt and then aids in the defeat of the Dark Jedi Kueller, whom she shoots to death. The Corellian trilogy (1995) by Roger MacBride Allen finds Han and Leia swept up in a civil war while visiting his homeworld of Corellia with their children. In the two Hand of Thrawn novels by Timothy Zahn (1997's Specter of the Past and 1998's Vision of the Future), Leia tries to hold the New Republic together as Moff Disra conspires for its volatile factions to destroy each other. Leia appears periodically in the Young Jedi Knights series (1995–98) by Kevin J. Anderson and Rebecca Moesta. The 14-volume young adult fiction series covers the Jedi training of Jacen and Jaina.

In The Truce at Bakura (1993) by Kathy Tyers, set one day after the ending of Return of the Jedi, Leia establishes New Alderaan, a sanctuary for the destroyed planet's surviving inhabitants. The spirit of Anakin Skywalker appears to Leia and pleads for her forgiveness, but she angrily banishes him. The six-volume Jedi Prince series (1992–93) by Paul Davids and Hollace Davids, later contradicted by other novels, is set within a year after Return of the Jedi. In The Glove of Darth Vader (1992), the self-proclaimed son of the defeated Emperor Palpatine, Trioculus, seeks the titular glove to cement himself as the new Emperor. Entranced by Leia's beauty in The Lost City of the Jedi (1992), Trioculus vows to make her his queen. He captures her in Zorba the Hutt's Revenge (1992), but Jabba the Hutt's vengeful father, Zorba, offers to trade his own prisoner Ken—Palpatine's real grandson whom Trioculus has been seeking—for Leia, his son's killer. But Leia and Ken are rescued and Trioculus is frozen in carbonate by Zorba. Mission from Mount Yoda (1993) finds Ken's father Triclops alive and willing to join the Rebels against the Empire. Leia, now engaged to Han, is captured by Zorba in Queen of the Empire (1993). Trioculus is revived and seizes Leia before Zorba can kill her. Leia is rescued and replaced with a lookalike droid decoy, which kills Trioculus. In Prophets of the Dark Side (1993), Leia looks forward to her wedding to Han and has a vision of their two children. Matthew Stover's 2008 standalone novel Luke Skywalker and the Shadows of Mindor picks up the story soon after, as Luke, Leia and the Rebels fight the Sith Lord Shadowspawn.

In The Courtship of Princess Leia (1994) by Dave Wolverton, set immediately before the Thrawn trilogy, Leia is presented with an advantageous political marriage to Prince Isolder of the planet Hapes. A jealous Han abducts Leia and takes her to the planet Dathomir; Luke and Isolder follow, and there they all find the hidden forces of the Imperial warlord Zsinj. Defeating him, Han and Leia marry. The 2003 novels A Forest Apart and Tatooine Ghost by Troy Denning are set immediately after The Courtship of Princess Leia. The newly married Leia fears that any children she has may succumb to the dark side like her father. During an adventure on Tatooine in Tatooine Ghost, she discovers the diary of her grandmother Shmi Skywalker and meets some of young Anakin's childhood friends. When she learns of Anakin's childhood as a slave and the traumatic death of his mother, Leia learns to forgive her father.

Works set between films
In Shadows of the Empire (1996) by Steve Perry, the only Star Wars novel set between The Empire Strikes Back and Return of the Jedi, Leia is searching for Boba Fett to find a captive Han. She is bewitched by the crime lord Prince Xizor using pheromones, but Chewbacca helps her elude the seduction.

Allegiance (2007) and Choices of One (2011) by Timothy Zahn are set between Star Wars: A New Hope and The Empire Strikes Back, and feature Leia and her cohorts seeking new allies for their Rebellion against the Empire. Razor's Edge (2013) by Martha Wells and Honor Among Thieves (2014) by James S. A. Corey take place in the same time period and also chronicle the adventures of Leia and Han.

New Jedi Order
In the New Jedi Order series (1999–2003), Leia resigns as Chief of State, and on the heels of her warnings before the Senate, the alien Yuuzhan Vong invade the galaxy. They destroy system after system and defeat both the Jedi and the New Republic forces in countless battles. Chewbacca dies in Vector Prime (1999) by R.A. Salvatore, which sends Han into a deep depression that causes a rift between him and Leia. They reunite after Leia is gravely wounded at the Battle of Duro in Kathy Tyers' Balance Point (2000). She is targeted by a deadly Voxyn slayer in Troy Dennings' Star By Star (2001), and though she manages to evade death, her son Anakin is later killed during a mission to prevent more Voxyn from being cloned. The Vong are finally defeated in The Unifying Force (2003) by James Luceno.

In Denning's The Dark Nest trilogy (2005), Leia, Han, and several Jedi become involved in an escalating border dispute between the Chiss and the insidious insectoid Killiks, and Leia makes a bitter enemy in the Twi'lek warrior Alema Rar. In The Joiner King (2005), Leia asks Saba Sebatyne to train her as a Jedi Knight. R2-D2 malfunctions in The Unseen Queen (2005) and shows Luke a holoclip of his father Anakin and a pregnant woman, whom Luke learns is his and Leia's biological mother, Padmé Amidala. Anakin and Padmé are discussing a dream of Anakin's in which Padmé dies in childbirth; later, Luke and Leia watch a clip in which Padmé is talking to Obi-Wan Kenobi about Anakin. Tenel Ka, Queen Mother of the Hapes Consortium, has a daughter, Allana, secretly fathered by Jacen. In The Swarm War (2005), Luke and Leia view holoclips of their mother's death, and Leia is promoted to Jedi Knight.

Legacy of the Force
The bestselling Legacy of the Force series (2006–08) chronicles the crossover of Han and Leia's son Jacen to the dark side of the Force while the Jedi, Solos, and Skywalkers fight against his growing power. In Betrayal (2006) by Aaron Allston, Jacen turns to the dark side, believing that it is the only way to save the galaxy from the chaos brewing among the member systems of the Galactic Alliance. Jacen realizes in Bloodlines (2006) by Karen Traviss that the Sith discipline will require him to kill one of his loved ones, which he decides is an acceptable sacrifice to save the galaxy. In Troy Denning's Tempest (2006), Han and Leia thwart the assassination of Tenel Ka and Allana but become caught up in a Corellian conspiracy. They are almost killed when the Millennium Falcon is attacked by a Star Destroyer controlled by an increasingly powerful Jacen—who knows that his parents are on board. With Han injured, Leia and Lando further investigate the Corellians in Aaron Allston's Exile (2007), but Alema reappears to exact her vengeance on Leia. Sacrifice (2007) by Karen Traviss finds Leia and Han on the run, hunted by Jacen as traitors to the Galactic Alliance. He kills Luke's wife Mara Jade as his final sacrifice to become Darth Caedus, the new ruler of the Sith. In Inferno (2007) by Troy Denning, Han and Leia are faced with the reality that their son, now Joint Chief of State, is the enemy. Leia attempts unsuccessfully to manipulate Jacen in Aaron Allston's Fury (2007) so that the Jedi can both thwart him and neutralize Alema. Finally, in Invincible (2008) by Troy Denning, Jaina kills Jacen in a lightsaber duel. At Tenel Ka's request, Leia and Han adopt Allana, disguised with the name "Amelia" to protect her from any future vengeance against Cadeus or the Hapes Consortium. Multiple novels in the series made the New York Times Best Seller list.

The nine-volume Fate of the Jedi series (2009–12) by Aaron Allston, Troy Denning, and Christie Golden finds Han and Leia become caught up in the intensifying conflict between the Galactic Alliance and the Jedi. In the wake of Darth Cadeus' death, the now-peaceful Galactic Alliance harbors a growing mistrust toward the Jedi, and the situation is worsened by a Force-induced psychosis that begins afflicting individual Jedi, sending them on violent rampages.

In Millennium Falcon (2008) by James Luceno, set between Legacy of the Force and Fate of the Jedi, a mysterious device hidden inside the eponymous spacecraft sends Han, Leia and Allana on an adventure to investigate the ship's past before it came into Han's possession. Troy Denning's Crucible (2013), set after Fate of the Jedi and the last novel to date in the Star Wars Legends chronology, reunites Leia, Han and Luke with Lando as they aid him to thwart a vast criminal enterprise threatening his asteroid mineral refinery in the Chilean Rift nebula.

Comics
Leia's youth is depicted in the non-canon Star Wars Tales story, The Princess Leia Diaries. In it, she develops her disdain for the Empire, as well as a conflict with Tarkin. She discovers and decides to support the Rebellion.

Dark Empire
During the events of the comic series Dark Empire (1991–92), Palpatine has been resurrected in a young clone body and seduces Luke to the dark side of the Force as part of his plan to restore the Empire. A captive Leia, resisting Palpatine's attempts to turn her as well, escapes with an artifact he needs to secure his power, the Jedi Holocron. Luke pursues her, and Leia manages to turn him back. Brother and sister then fight Palpatine with the light side of the Force, turning his own Force-generated storm against him and destroying Palpatine and his Star Destroyer. In Dark Empire II (1994–95), Leia gives birth to a third child by Han, whom she names Anakin. Palpatine is reborn in an inferior, rapidly deteriorating clone body in Empire's End (1995), and seeks to possess the body of the infant Anakin.

Video games
Leia appears as a playable character in every Lego Star Wars video game to date.  

She is also a playable character in both Star Wars Battlefront and Star Wars Battlefront II.

She also appears as a playable character in Disney Infinity 3.0.

Cultural impact

Princess Leia has been called a 1980s icon, a feminist hero and "an exemplary personification of female empowerment". In 2008, Leia was selected by Empire magazine as the 89th greatest film character of all time, and IGN listed her as their 8th top Star Wars hero. UGO Networks listed Leia as one of their best heroes of all time in 2010.

The character has been referenced or parodied in several TV shows and films, and celebrated in cosplay. Fisher appeared in the Leia metal bikini on the cover of the Summer 1983 issue of Rolling Stone, and a painting of Leia and other characters surrounding Lucas appeared on the cover of the May 25, 1983, issue of Time announcing Return of the Jedi. In 2013, cartoonist Jeffrey Brown published the bestselling Star Wars: Vader's Little Princess, a comic strip-style book featuring Darth Vader and a young Leia in humorous father-daughter situations. Princess Leia appears on a 2007 US postage stamp and a 2015 UK stamp.

Leia has also been used in a wide range of Star Wars merchandise, including statuettes, action figures and other toys, household items and clothing, office supplies, food products, and bubble bath and shampoo in Leia-shaped bottles with her head as the cap. In her one-woman show Wishful Drinking, Fisher called the Princess Leia Pez dispenser one of the "merchandising horrors" of the series. In a 2011 interview, Fisher said:

After the 2012 acquisition of LucasFilm by the Walt Disney Company, the Disney Store stated in May 2014 that the company had "no plans for Leia products". After public criticism, Disney told Time in June 2014 that it would be releasing several Leia products. Funko has since produced several versions of Leia (at least one for each film) in their POP! line of 4.5-inch vinyl figures in the Japanese super deformed style. Hasbro is set to release an action figure of Leia as she appears in the Star Wars Rebels animated series.

"Cinnamon buns" hairstyle
Leia's unique hairdo in 1977's A New Hope has come to be known as the "doughnut" or "cinnamon buns" hairstyle, and is iconic of the character and series. A February 1978 cover story for the British teen magazine Jackie included step-by-step instructions on how to replicate Leia's hair buns. In the 1978 short film parody Hardware Wars, Princess Anne-Droid has actual cinnamon buns on the side of her head. Miss Piggy of The Muppet Show copied the hairdo in a Star Wars-themed episode of the series in February 1980. In the 1987 Mel Brooks comedy film Spaceballs, Princess Vespa (Daphne Zuniga) appears to have the hairstyle, which is soon revealed to in fact be a large pair of headphones. In the parody film Thumb Wars, the role of Leia was filled by a character named Princess Bunhead, who has two cinnamon rolls for hair. In 2015, Fisher's daughter Billie Lourd's character in the horror-comedy TV series Scream Queens, a rich and disaffected sorority girl known as Chanel No. 3, wears earmuffs in every scene as an homage to Fisher's iconic Leia hairstyle. Lourd also has a cameo in The Force Awakens (2015) in which she wears Leia's distinctive hair buns.

Feminist analysis
Leia has been the subject of feminist analysis. Mark Edlitz wrote for The Huffington Post in 2010 that "Leia is an exemplary personification of female empowerment." David Bushman, television curator at the Paley Center for Media, said in 2012, "From the male perspective ... Princess Leia was a very creditable character for her time—not perfect, but certainly defiant, assertive, and strong." Alyssa Rosenberg of The Washington Post wrote in 2015, "Leia wasn't just the first great heroine of science fiction and fantasy to capture my imagination. She was one of the first characters I encountered whose power came from her political conviction and acumen." In her 2007 article "Feminism and the Force: Empowerment and Disillusionment in a Galaxy Far, Far Away", Diana Dominguez cited Leia as a welcome change from the previous portrayals of women in film and TV. She wrote:

Rosenberg writes that, though at first Luke is an apolitical innocent in search of adventure and Han is a detached opportunist in search of money, both are "influenced by Leia's passion [and] take their places as full participants in the Rebellion". She notes, "Everyone else eventually comes around to Leia's view of the world." Leia herself, singularly dedicated to her political movement against the Empire, "finds a partner in Han, acknowledging that personal happiness can help her sustain her commitment to building a better galactic order". Rosenberg cites "Leia's willingness to see the best in him, and Han's desire to live up to her belief in him" as a foundation of their relationship, also pointing out his attempts to make her recognize that she has needs like anyone else and should acknowledge that she needs him.

In their 2012 essay "Lightsabers, Political Arenas, and Marriages", Ray Merlock and Kathy Merlock Jackson cite Leia as the successor of earlier science fiction heroines Wilma Deering of Buck Rogers and Dale Arden of Flash Gordon, and the embodiment of "a new stage in the ongoing presentation of the fairy-tale princess in jeopardy". Writing that "after Leia, no longer would princesses be passive and salvaged simply with a kiss," they note the reflection of the character in later Disney Princess animated films and in woman warriors such as Ellen Ripley from the Alien franchise and Xena of the adventure TV series Xena: Warrior Princess. A. O. Scott of The New York Times described Leia as "a foremother of Hermione Granger and Katniss Everdeen and of countless latter-day Disney princesses. She also foretold the recent, somewhat belated feminist turn in the Star Wars cycle itself".

Mark Hamill described Fisher's performance as:

Fisher herself described Leia as a "huge" feminist icon, dismissing the suggestion that the character was ever a "damsel in distress". Fisher said of Leia, "She bossed them around. I don't know what your idea of distress is, but that wasn't it! And I wasn't some babe running through the galaxy with my tits bouncing around. So I wasn't threatening to women". She added, "I like Princess Leia. I like how she was feisty. I like how she killed Jabba the Hutt". "I think I am Princess Leia, and Princess Leia is me. It's like a Möbius striptease."

Metal bikini

Leia's slave costume when she is held captive by Jabba the Hutt at the beginning of Return of the Jedi—made of brass and dubbed Leia's "Metal Bikini" or "Gold Bikini"—immediately made the character (and Fisher) a "generational sex symbol" celebrated by pin-up posters, and later merchandising and cosplay. The outfit has gained a cult following of its own.

Rosenberg noted that "the costume has become culturally iconic in a way that has slipped loose from the context of the scenes in which Leia wore it and the things she does after she is forced into the outfit." Wired wrote in 2006, "There's no doubt that the sight of Carrie Fisher in the gold sci-fi swimsuit was burned into the sweaty subconscious of a generation of fanboys hitting puberty in the spring of 1983." Acknowledging the opinion of some that the "Slave Leia" iconography tarnishes the character's position as "feminist hero", Rosenberg argues:

Science fiction filmmaker Letia Clouston concurs, saying "Sci-fi has had a long history of strong female characters. Yes, Princess Leia was in a gold bikini, but she was also the one who single-handedly killed Jabba. When you take into account movies and TV shows like Terminator, Aliens, Battlestar Galactica, and even video games like Metroid, you can see sci-fi has consistently promoted the strength of women more than any other genre."

Relationships

Family tree

Mentorship tree

See also
 List of Kenner Star Wars action figures
 Solo family

References
Footnotes

Citations

External links

 
 
 Leia Organa on IMDb

Characters created by George Lucas
Female characters in film
Adoptee characters in films
Fictional ambassadors
Film characters introduced in 1977
Fictional commanders
Fictional diplomats
Fictional feminists and women's rights activists
Fictional female generals
Fictional women soldiers and warriors
Fictional ghosts
Fictional heads of state
Fictional military personnel in films
Fictional military strategists
Fictional extraterrestrial princesses
Fictional revolutionaries
Fictional senators
Fictional twins
Fictional war veterans
Star Wars Anthology characters
Star Wars characters who are Force-sensitive
Star Wars comics characters
Star Wars Jedi characters
Star Wars literary characters
Star Wars Rebels characters
Star Wars Resistance characters
Star Wars Skywalker Saga characters
Star Wars television characters
Star Wars video game characters
Fictional princesses